True Farm is a historic farm and summer estate in Holderness, New Hampshire. Located off New Hampshire Route 113 on True Farm Road, the farm is based around a c.1820 farmhouse, and was expanded into a summer estate in 1920 by George Saltonstall West. The  estate includes numerous outbuildings and a lakefront cottage. The farm was listed on the National Register of Historic Places in 2012.

Description and history
The property is a mix of woodlands, open fields, and manicured landscapes, and includes residences, farm outbuildings, and estate outbuildings including a bathhouse, playhouse, and springhouse. The main house is a c.1820 farmhouse located among fields south of the True Farm/113 junction. Primarily Federal in its styling, it was given significant Colonial Revival features in the 1920s. A smaller Colonial Revival house, built in the 1920s to house farmhands, lies a short way southwest of the main house. A small cluster of buildings lie screened in woods between Route 113 and Squam Lake.

The farm was operated by a long line of True family members until 1888, when Charles True began leasing part of the farm out for Camp Algonquin, the second summer camp for children on Squam Lake, and also began to take on seasonal boarders at the farm. One of the camp's attendees was George Saltonstall West, who in 1920 purchased the property and began its conversion into a seasonal summer property. The property was operated in part as a working farm, with the Wests shipping its products to their home in Chestnut Hill, Massachusetts. The property was divided among his heirs after George West's death in 1959.

See also
Webster Estate, located nearby
National Register of Historic Places listings in Grafton County, New Hampshire

References

Further reading

Houses on the National Register of Historic Places in New Hampshire
Houses completed in 1820
Houses in Grafton County, New Hampshire
Farms on the National Register of Historic Places in New Hampshire
National Register of Historic Places in Grafton County, New Hampshire
Holderness, New Hampshire